Born to Rock may refer to:
 Born to Rock (novel), a 2006 novel by Gordon Korman
 Born to Rock (album), a 1989 album by Carl Perkins
 Born to Rock, a 2005 album by the Dangerfields